Minuscule 396 (in the Gregory-Aland numbering), ε 217 (Soden), is a Greek minuscule manuscript of the New Testament, on parchment. Paleographically it has been assigned to the 12th century. 
It has marginalia.

Description 

The codex contains the text of the four Gospels on 115 parchment leaves with one large lacunae (Matthew 1:1-23:27). It is written in one column per page, in 27 lines per page, in silver.

There is also a division according to the smaller Ammonian Sections (in Mark 240 Sections, the last in 16:9), with references to the Eusebian Canons (written below Ammonian Section numbers).

Text 

The Greek text of the codex is a representative of the Byzantine text-type. Hermann von Soden classified it to the textual family Kx. Aland placed it in Category V.

According to the Claremont Profile Method it represents textual family Kx in Luke 1 and Luke 20. In Luke 10 no profile was made. In Luke 1 it belongs to the cluster Ω.

History 

The manuscript was added to the list of New Testament manuscripts by Scholz (1794–1852).

It was examined by Scholz, Gebhardt (1882), and C. R. Gregory (1886).

The manuscript is currently housed at the Vatican Library (Chis. R IV 6 (gr. 6) in Rome.

See also 

 List of New Testament minuscules
 Biblical manuscript
 Textual criticism

References

Further reading 

 

Greek New Testament minuscules
12th-century biblical manuscripts
Manuscripts of the Vatican Library